Hugo César Lopes da Silva Soares (born 15 December 1974) is an Angolan former football striker.

Titles

External links
 
 
 
 elperiodico.com
 
 rsssf.com
 
 
 lapreferente.com
 
 enunabaldosa.com 
 
 

1974 births
Living people
Footballers from Luanda
Angolan people of Portuguese descent
Angolan footballers
Angolan expatriate footballers
Expatriate footballers in Bolivia
Club San José players
Expatriate footballers in Argentina
Defensa y Justicia footballers
Expatriate footballers in Venezuela
Expatriate footballers in Peru
Deportivo Pesquero footballers
Expatriate footballers in Greece
Super League Greece players
Xanthi F.C. players
S.C. Pombal players
Angolan expatriate sportspeople in Portugal
Expatriate footballers in Portugal
Angolan expatriate sportspeople in Spain
Expatriate footballers in Spain
CE Sabadell FC footballers
Association football forwards
Angolan musicians
Gospel musicians
Angolan expatriate sportspeople in Bolivia